The painter Fendry Ekel (born 1971, Jakarta) is based in Berlin and Yogyakarta. Ekel's works have been displayed Internationally: the Netherlands, France, Belgium, Spain, Mexico, Italy, Turkey, Czech Republic, Singapore, South Africa, the United Kingdom, Germany, Australia and the United States.

Biography
Fendry Ekel migrated in the 80's with his family from Indonesia to Europe. He studied in Amsterdam (1992 - 1997) at Gerrit Rietveld Academie  and (1998 - 1999) at Rijksakademie van Beeldende Kunsten where he met painters Narcisse Tordoir, Luc Tuymans and Michelangelo Pistoletto as mentors. In 1999 Fendry Ekel was an Artist in Residence at Cittadellarte, Fondazione Pistoletto in Biella, Italy.

Fendry Ekel's migration as teenager from Indonesia to Europe was a radical move that has given rise to a continuing fascination for investigating his surroundings. Architecture and the urban landscape is a perfect setting where abstraction and figuration meet each other in reality. It is in this setting that Ekel preferably locates the subjects of his paintings.  Fendry Ekel's paintings explore the shadow side of human ambition. In his art practice Ekel is intrigued by the power of cliche, producing images intended to create an unguarded moment in seeing when cliches are twisted into an unexpected new awareness and a kind of simultaneous Déjà vu.  His large-scale, layered works are often based on black and white photographs depicting portraits, architecture, monuments or other remnants of historic events. By appropriating these images from our collective memory, Ekel critically investigates the use of art, architecture and figuration as propaganda for ideology, confronting himself during the creative process with borderlines where ethical and aesthetic values intersect.

In 2013 Fendry Ekel initiated a series of works entitled 'Investigation' paintings. In this series Ekel unveils layers of forgotten and untold stories, exploring the most elementary motives behind the human desire to create myths of their own time.

(The Sultans Of Indonesian Art, Flash Art 282, 2012) ... Like Ashley Bickerton, who has lately emerged from a self-imposed exile in Bali, Fendry Ekel has in recent years returned to his homeland with a profoundly altered awareness of the role of memory and artifice in history and art. Having lived in the Netherlands since the age of 14 when his family emigrated from Indonesia, Ekel creates artwork and institutional structures that simultaneously craft and consume messages about ego and influence. While his studio practice falls within traditional lines of production, primarily creating well-researched and beautifully executed works on paper, Ekel’s institutional practice as co-founder of artists initiative Office: for Contemporary Art (OFCA) International in Yogyakarta, focuses on developing organizational networks and “structural friendships.” By consciously adopting the conflicted roles of both the romanticized studio painter and art world insider/strategist, he twists clichés and demands we pay close attention to history and inner prejudice. Take for example the lifecycle of his iconic Young Gropius As Soldier (2007), an image that both illuminates and obscures the identity of an historic public figure by complicating the story of Walter Gropius, the director of the highly influential Bauhaus, with unsettling and questionable references to his military history in the German army. Once completed, the artist distanced himself from the creative impetus through strategic efforts as an employee of OFCA International to place the work in the public realm through exhibitions and publications, thereby legitimizing its value and ensuring its consumption. This effort is, in fact, part of the conceptual completion of the work and reflects Ekel’s efforts to “pull the strings” of a system that demands his assimilation/loyalty and yet refuses entrance on grounds of his “otherness.”

See also
 I Nyoman Masriadi

References

External links
The New York Times 
HVCCA, New York 
OFCA INTERNATIONAL(OFFICE For Contemporary Art, International)

Flash Art, The Sultans Of Indonesian Art

1971 births
Living people
People from Jakarta
Indonesian painters
Dutch painters
Dutch male painters
Contemporary painters
Indonesian emigrants to the Netherlands